Samitirhat Union is a union of Fatikchhari Upazila of Chittagong District.

Geography
Samitirhat has an area of 2,601 acres (10.53 km2).

Location
 North: Nanupur Union
 East:  Jafotnagar Union
 South: Hathazari Upazila
 West:  Roshangiri Union

Population
At the 1991 Bangladesh census, Samitirhat Union had a population of 15,502.

References
 Samitirhat Union details, lcgbangladesh.org

Unions of Fatikchhari Upazila